Showqabad (also Romanized as Showqābād; also known as Shūkhābād) is a village in Rigan Rural District, in the Central District of Rigan County, Kerman Province, Iran. At the 2006 census, its population was 389, in 73 families.

References 

Populated places in Rigan County